The 7th FINA World Junior Synchronized Swimming Championships was held August 15–19, 2001 at the King County Aquatic Center in Federal Way, United States. The synchronised swimmers are aged between 15 and 18 years old, from 28 nations, swimming in three events: Solo, Duet and Team.

Participating nations
28 nations swam at the 2001 World Junior Championships were:

Results

References

FINA World Junior Synchronised Swimming Championships
2001 in synchronized swimming
Swimming
Jun
International aquatics competitions hosted by the United States
2010 in sports in Washington (state)
Sports competitions in Washington (state)
Synchronized swimming competitions in the United States